Younes Bakiz (born 5 February 1999) is a Danish professional footballer who plays as a winger for Danish Superliga club AaB.

Career

Early years
Growing up in Vestegnen to Moroccan parents, Bakiz played football as a youth for Brøndby IF, Holbæk B&I and HB Køge before making his breakthrough as part of FC Roskilde in 2018.

Viborg
After having made 43 appearances for Roskilde, in which he scored 13 goals, Bakiz signed a three-year contract with Viborg FF in June 2020. In his first season, he won the second-tier 1st Division with the club and secured promotion to the Danish Superliga. He made 21 appearances and scored three goals.

On 18 July 2021, Bakiz made his Superliga-debut in a 2–1 away win over Nordsjælland. Starting on the left wing, he scored the 1–1 equaliser in the 41st minute of the game, before being substituted by Jeff Mensah in the 78th minute.

AaB
On deadline day, 31 August 2022, Bakiz joined fellow league club AaB on a deal until June 2026. He made his competitive debut for the club four days later, coming on as a substitute in the 74th minute for Allan Sousa in a 2–0 away win over Midtjylland. On 14 October, he scored his first goals for AaB, a brace, which secured a 2–0 victory against Lyngby. He scored another brace on 30 October against his former side Brøndby in AaB's 3–2 away loss.

Career statistics

Honours
Viborg
Danish 1st Division: 2020–21

References

External links
 
 

1999 births
Living people
Danish men's footballers
Danish people of Moroccan descent
Association football wingers
Brøndby IF players
FC Roskilde players
Viborg FF players
AaB Fodbold players
Danish 1st Division players
Danish Superliga players
People from Albertslund Municipality
Sportspeople from the Capital Region of Denmark